The University College of Agriculture and Environmental Studies (UCAES) is a tertiary education initiative by the Akyem Abuakwa Traditional Council under the authority of the Okyenhene Amoatia Ofori Panin II (King of Akyem Abuakwa).

It is the first university in Africa dedicated to agriculture and environmental studies. The university was registered under Ghana's Companies Code, 1963 (Act 179) as a company limited by guarantee in October 2006.

The University College is located at Bunso, in the East Akyem Municipality of the Eastern Region.  It is a secular tertiary co-educational institution incorporated under the Ghana Companies Code, 1963 (Act 179) on 19 October 2006, and is one of the private sector initiatives for tertiary education.

Mission 
The mission of the university college in the next five years is to become an institution that provides high quality tertiary education in agriculture and the environment and through which developmental programmes in Ghana can be achieved with strong emphasis on high moral and ethical values among the youth. It will also help raise the standard of education and development at Bunso and its environs through outreach programmes which are demand-driven. UCAES aims to provide, thorough education and training, functional and general skills in contemporary studies/issues to Ghanaians in general within its core mandate of providing advanced studies in sustainable exploitation and preservation of the environment through the complementarities of teaching, research and dissemination/practice of knowledge so acquired.

Programmes 
The   college  offers a four-year Bachelor of Science programme in: 
 B.Sc. Sustainable Agriculture
 B.Sc. Sustainable Forestry
 B.Sc. Environmental Science and Management

Governance and organisation 

The Chancellor The Okyenhene (occupant of the Akyem Abuakwa Stool) serves as Chancellor, and the chairman of the council is appointed by the Court; all other principal officers are appointed by the council.

See also
 List of universities in Ghana

References

External links
University web site

Education in Ghana
Environmental studies institutions in Ghana